A Prayer for Every Hour is the debut full-length album from New Jersey indie rock band Danielson Famile.

Track listing
 "Nice of Me"
 "Feeling Tank"
 "Ugly Tree"
 "Like a Vacuum"
 "Need a Beard"
 "Pepcid 20mg"
 "Birds"
 "1,000 Push-ups"
 "God Bless"
 "Guilt Scout"
 "What to Wear"
 "Do a Good Turn Daily"
 "Burn in Hart"
 "Hot Air"
 "Be Your Wildman"
 "Pray 1,995 Prayers"
 "Headz in the Cloudz"
 "Soul"
 "Heimlich Remover"
 "Naive Child"
 "Tell Me Oh You"
 "In the Malls Not of Them"
 "No Foundation"
 "Pretty"

References

Danielson Famile albums
1995 debut albums
Tooth & Nail Records albums
Secretly Canadian albums
Fire Records (UK) albums